Clathrina procumbens is a species of calcareous sponge from Australia.

References 

 World Register of Marine Species entry

Clathrina
Sponges described in 1885
Sponges of Australia